Harmilla is a butterfly genus in the family Nymphalidae. It contains only one species, Harmilla elegans, the elegant forester, which is found in Nigeria, Cameroon, the Republic of the Congo, the Democratic Republic of the Congo and Uganda. The habitat consists of swamp forests with a dense understorey.

Adults are attracted to fallen fruit.

Subspecies
Harmilla elegans elegans (Nigeria, Cameroon, Congo, Democratic Republic of the Congo: Bas-Zaire)
Harmilla elegans hawkeri Joicey & Talbot, 1926 (western Uganda, Democratic Republic of the Congo: Equateur, Uele, Ituri, Kivu)

References

Seitz, A. Die Gross-Schmetterlinge der Erde 13: Die Afrikanischen Tagfalter. Plate XIII 45

Limenitidinae
Monotypic butterfly genera
Butterflies described in 1891
Nymphalidae genera